Grace E. Madden (married name: Ward; born July 30, 1911 in Marblehead, Massachusetts, died June 14, 1987 in Darien, Connecticut) was an American pair skater. With brother J. Lester Madden, she was the 1934 U.S. national champion. They competed at the 1936 Winter Olympics and placed 11th.

Results
(pairs with J. Lester Madden)

References

 
  

American female pair skaters
Olympic figure skaters of the United States
Figure skaters at the 1936 Winter Olympics
1911 births
1987 deaths
People from Marblehead, Massachusetts
Sportspeople from Essex County, Massachusetts
20th-century American women
20th-century American people